Sir Thomas Watt (1857  1947) was a South African politician and cabinet minister.

Watt studied at the University of Glasgow and became a lawyer. In 1883 he arrived in Natal and went to Dundee. After serving for Britain in the Anglo-Boer War, he was elected to the Natal Legislative Assembly and became Minister of Justice and Education for the colony and later from 1908 to 1909 a member of the National Convention which drafted the South African Act in terms of which Union was possible the following year. After the unification he became Minister of Posts and Public Works in Louis Botha's cabinet. He serves under him and Jan Smuts fell to the South African Party in 1924 as Minister of Public Welfare, Home Affairs and Railways. He died in 1947 at the age of 90.

In 1907, the King approved the retention of the title "Honourable" as he had served for more than three years as a member of the Executive Council of the Colony of Natal. He was appointed a Knight Commander of the Order of St Michael and St George (KCMG) in the 1912 New Year Honours, having been appointed a Commander of the same Order in the 1906 Birthday Honours.

References

 Rosenthal, Eric. 1978. Encyclopaedia of Southern Africa. Cape Town and Johannesburg: Juta and Company Limited.

1857 births
1947 deaths
Alumni of the University of Glasgow
Politicians from Glasgow
Scottish emigrants to South Africa
20th-century South African politicians
Health ministers of South Africa
Ministers of Home Affairs of South Africa
Knights Commander of the Order of St Michael and St George